The 1981–82 Rugby League Premiership was the eighth end of season Rugby League Premiership competition.

The winners were Widnes.

First round

Semi-finals

Final

References

1982 in English rugby league